It was the first edition of the tournament. All quarterfinal matches were cancelled by the supervisor, due to heavy rain and flooding.

Seeds
The top two seeds received a by into the second round.

Draw

Top half

Bottom half

References

 Main Draw
 Qualifying Draw

Open de la Reunion - Singles
2011 in Réunion